Philip Richard Morris  (4 December 1836 – 22 April 1902) was an English painter of genre and maritime scenes (particularly allegorical ones of rural life), Holman Hunt-influenced religious paintings and (later in his career) portraits.

Life

Morris was born in Devonport. Taken to London aged 14 by his iron-founder father to train for the family trade, Philip became increasingly interested in art and, with William Holman Hunt winning round his father, began taking evening drawing classes in the British Museum and (from 1855) in the Royal Academy Schools. At the latter, he used the travelling studentship he won for his The Good Samaritan to fund a journey to Italy and France, remaining there until 1864.

He was elected an Associate of the Royal Academy in 1877 (despite his talents and health already being on the wane), though he resigned it in 1900. In 1878 he married a widow, Catherine Sargeantson, the daughter of J. Evans of Llangollen, they had two sons and three daughters. Catherine died in 1886, his daughter Florence married the archaeologist Alexander Keiller and his eldest daughter, Gladys Morris (1879–1946), married the noted British sportsman, journalist and editor, Bertram Fletcher Robinson. Morris died in Clifton Hill, Maida Vale, London.

References

External links
 
Philip Morris (1833 - 1902) and Family at www.bfronline.biz
Biography of Gladys Hill Morris at www.bfronline.biz
 Profile on Royal Academy of Arts Collections

1836 births
1902 deaths
19th-century English painters
English male painters
British genre painters
Artists from Plymouth, Devon
Artists' Rifles soldiers
Associates of the Royal Academy
Alumni of the Royal Academy Schools
19th-century English male artists